Fair Trading Act may refer to:
 Fair Trading Act 1973, in the United Kingdom
 Fair Trading Act 1986, in New Zealand